Released for Death is a 1938 crime thriller novel by the British writer Henry Wade. Wade was a writer of the Golden Age of Detective Fiction, best known for his series featuring Inspector Poole. This was one of a number of stand-alone novels he wrote. It has elements of an inverted detective story, rather than the traditional closed circle of suspects.

Synopsis
Two convicts at Hadstone prison are approaching the end of their sentences. Shortly after their release an ex-prison warder with whom they had clashed is murdered, with all the evidence pointing to one of the men. The investigating detective Constable Bragg begins to believe he may have been framed by his fellow convict.

References

Bibliography
 Magill, Frank Northen . Critical Survey of Mystery and Detective Fiction: Authors, Volume 4. Salem Press, 1988.
 Reilly, John M. Twentieth Century Crime & Mystery Writers. Springer, 2015.

1938 British novels
Novels by Henry Wade
British mystery novels
British crime novels
British detective novels
British thriller novels
Constable & Co. books
Novels set in England